Ganjehi (also Romanized as Ganjeh’ī; also known as Ganjeh) is a village in Anarestan Rural District, Chenar Shahijan District, Kazerun County, Fars Province, Iran. At the 2006 census, its population was 659, in 170 families.

References 

Populated places in Chenar Shahijan County